Darwen railway station serves Darwen, a town in Lancashire, England. It was opened in 1847 by the Bolton, Blackburn, Clitheroe & West Yorkshire Railway, which was subsequently taken over by the Lancashire and Yorkshire Railway twelve years later. It is now served by Northern Trains services on the Ribble Valley Line from Rochdale/Manchester Victoria to Blackburn and into Clitheroe.

Darwen is set amongst the hills of East Lancashire.

History
The station was renamed Darwen on 1 December 1883.

The neighbouring stations either side which also served the area, at Lower Darwen and Spring Vale, were both closed in 1958 and the nearest surviving station to the south is now .

Facilities

The station has two platforms. It is one of only two passing points on the otherwise single track Blackburn to Bolton part of the route, but trains normally cross here only in the morning and evening peak periods.  The loop was extended in length by a mile (1.6 km) either side of the station during a six-week-long engineering blockade in July & August 2015 to increase capacity on the line and eventually allow a half-hourly service to operate (as specified in the new Northern franchise agreement, due to come into effect in April 2016).

The station is currently unstaffed, with waiting shelters on each platform; step-free access is available to both.  Ticket machines are available, along with a long-line P.A system and passenger information screens to convey train running information.

Services

On Sundays the service is usually hourly to both Clitheroe and Manchester.

References

External links

Railway stations in Blackburn with Darwen
DfT Category F1 stations
Former Lancashire and Yorkshire Railway stations
Railway stations in Great Britain opened in 1847
Northern franchise railway stations
Darwen
1847 establishments in England